is a Japanese professional footballer who plays as a forward for Cambodian Premier League club Visakha.

Career statistics

Club

Notes

Honours

Club
 Khonkaen United
 Thai League 3 (1): 2019

References

1992 births
Living people
Association football people from Hyōgo Prefecture
Kansai University alumni
Japanese footballers
Japanese expatriate footballers
Association football forwards
FC Tiamo Hirakata players
Ayeyawady United F.C. players
Lao Toyota F.C. players
Takumu Nishihara
Expatriate footballers in Myanmar
Japanese expatriate sportspeople in Myanmar
Expatriate footballers in Laos
Japanese expatriate sportspeople in Laos
Expatriate footballers in Thailand
Expatriate footballers in Cambodia
Japanese expatriate sportspeople in Cambodia
Japanese expatriate sportspeople in Thailand